In mathematics, Hölder's theorem states that the gamma function does not satisfy any algebraic differential equation whose coefficients are rational functions. This result was first proved by Otto Hölder in 1887; several alternative proofs have subsequently been found.

The theorem also generalizes to the -gamma function.

Statement of the theorem

For every  there is no non-zero polynomial  such that

where  is the gamma function. 

For example, define  by 

Then the equation

is called an algebraic differential equation, which, in this case, has the solutions  and  — the Bessel functions of the first and second kind respectively. Most of the familiar special functions of mathematical physics are differentially algebraic. All algebraic combinations of differentially algebraic functions are differentially algebraic. Furthermore, all compositions of differentially algebraic functions are differentially algebraic. Hölder’s Theorem simply states that the gamma function, is not differentially algebraic and is therefore transcendentally transcendental.

Proof

Let  and assume that a non-zero polynomial  exists such that

Assume also that  has the lowest possible overall degree with respect to the lexicographic ordering  For example,

Next, observe that for all  we have:

If we define a second polynomial  by the transformation

then we obtain the following algebraic differential equation for :

 

Consequently, the polynomial

Hence, defining  by 

 

we get

A change of variables then yields 

 

and an application of mathematical induction (along with a change of variables at each induction step) to the earlier expression

reveals that

Therefore, no such  exists, and so  is not differentially algebraic. Q.E.D.

References

Gamma and related functions
Theorems in analysis